MGT or Mgt may be:

Technology
Master guide table, included in the Program and System Information Protocol used for providing electronic television programme guides
Miles Gordon Technology, British technology company which produced ZX Spectrum add-ons
 Million Gross Tons
Mobile Global Title, address used in the SCCP protocol for routing signaling messages to mobile devices on telecommunications networks
Multi-gigabit transceiver, serialiser/deserialiser capable of operating at serial bitrates above 1 gigabit/second

Other
Magnesium L-threonate, a dietary supplement in humans, intended to boost cognitive functioning.
An uncommon abbreviation for management
Doctor of Management (D.Mgt.), academic degree awarded on the basis of advanced study and research in management
Mongol language (Papua New Guinea), ISO 639-3 code
Morgan Guaranty Trust Company, American company formed in 1959 following JP Morgan's purchase of the Guaranty Trust Company of New York
Muslim Girls Training, the all-female training program of the Nation of Islam
 Magnetik Tank, a Loriciels game
Mongolia's Got Talent TV Series
 Mark Thwaite (also known as MGT), English rock guitarist
Milingimbi Airport, IATA airport code "MGT"

Organizations 
 MGT Capital Investments, Inc., a cyber group founded by John McAfee.